Kagisano Local Municipality was a local municipality in Dr Ruth Segomotsi Mompati District Municipality, North West Province, South Africa, until the election of 18 May 2011, when it was merged with the Molopo Local Municipality to form the Kagisano-Molopo Local Municipality.

Main places
The 2001 census divided the municipality into the following main places:

References

Former local municipalities of South Africa